Route 21 is a highway in eastern Missouri. Its northern terminus is at Route 30 in Affton. Its southern terminus is at the Arkansas state line (where it continues as Highway 115). In the St. Louis area, it is known as Tesson Ferry Road, which was named after the 19th century proprietor of the ferry across the Meramec River.

The section through northern Jefferson County, Missouri was considered dangerous. As a result, the road was rerouted and built to freeway standards. Construction to reroute the highway to just south of Hillsboro was completed on December 15, 2008 and Route 21 is currently freeway standard from Route 141 to Highway B.  Plans to extend the freeway south to DeSoto have been approved, but funds are lacking to complete this part of the project.

Route 21 from the Meramec River to Route B, along with Route M, make up the Jefferson County Scenic Byway.

Major intersections

Hillsboro Business Spur

Business 21 follows the old alignment of Route 21 through the city of Hillsboro.  It begins at the intersection of Route 21 and Highway B on the southern edge of the city, and continues north to the intersection of Route A and Old Route 21, where it ends. Business 21 is the only way one can now reach Route BB,  as the rerouting of Route 21 bypasses the road.

See also

 List of state highways in Missouri
 List of highways numbered 21

References

External links

021
Transportation in Ripley County, Missouri
Transportation in Carter County, Missouri
Transportation in Reynolds County, Missouri
Transportation in Iron County, Missouri
Transportation in Washington County, Missouri
Transportation in Jefferson County, Missouri
Transportation in St. Louis County, Missouri